Samir Zulič  (born 8 January 1966) is a retired Slovenian footballer who played as a defender.

Club career
Zulič played for Koper in the Yugoslav Second League during the 1985–86 season.

International career
Zulič has made eight appearances for the senior Slovenia national football team.

Honours
Koper
Slovenian Republic League (1): 1987–88
Slovenian Republic Cup (2): 1989–90, 1990–91

Olimpija
Slovenian PrvaLiga (4): 1991–92, 1992–93, 1993–94, 1994–95
Slovenian Cup (2) : 1992–93, 1995–96
Slovenian Supercup (1): 1995

References

External links

1966 births
Living people
Sportspeople from Koper
Yugoslav footballers
Slovenian footballers
Association football defenders
Slovenian PrvaLiga players
FC Koper players
NK Olimpija Ljubljana (1945–2005) players
Slovenia international footballers